Przemysław Wysocki (born 21 March 1989 in Nasielsk) is a Polish striker who plays for Żbik Nasielsk. He was one of the most talented left backs in his country. Unfortunately many injuries have stopped his career. He was a captain of Poland national under-19 football team. In 2008 Leo Beenhakker invited him for a consultation in Wronki as a potential player of Poland national football team.

References

External links 
 

1989 births
Living people
Polish footballers
Legia Warsaw players
Association football defenders
People from Nasielsk
Sportspeople from Masovian Voivodeship